Heinrich von Bamberger (27 December 1822, Zwornarka, Kingdom of Bohemia – 9 November 1888, Vienna) was an Austrian pathologist. He was father to internist Eugen von Bamberger (1858-1921).

Biography
In 1847 he earned his doctorate from the University of Prague, and from 1851 to 1854 was a clinical assistant to Johann von Oppolzer (1808-1871) in Vienna. In 1854 he became professor of therapeutic pathology at the University of Würzburg, returning to the University of Vienna in 1872, where he succeeded Oppolzer as professor of special pathology and therapy. Among his assistants in Vienna was internist Edmund von Neusser (1852-1912).

Bamberger was a specialist in respiratory and circulatory pathology, remembered for his research involving diseases of the pericardium, heart tissues, and the larger vessels. He provided early descriptions of hematogenous albuminuria, uremic pericarditis and progressive polyserositis. The eponymous "Bamberger's disease" is named after him, characterized by spasmodic affections of the leg muscles.

In 1857 he published Lehrbuch der Krankheiten des Herzens (Handbook of diseases of the heart), one of the first textbooks dedicated to cardiac pathology.  Another of his publications of note was Die Krankheiten des chylopoetischen Systems (On the diseases of the chylopoietic system, 1855).

See also
 Pathology
 List of pathologists

Notes

References 
 Heinrich von Bamberger @ Who Named It

External links 
 Dates in Cardiology by H. S. J. Lee

1822 births
1888 deaths
Scientists from Prague
People from the Kingdom of Bohemia
Austrian untitled nobility
19th-century Czech people
19th-century Austrian physicians
Austrian pathologists
Academic staff of the University of Vienna
Academic staff of the University of Würzburg
Austrian expatriates in Germany
Czech expatriates in Germany